Much Woolton Old School is a small Grade II* listed building on School Lane in Woolton, Liverpool, United Kingdom.

An inscription on the building's exterior claims it to be the "oldest elementary school building in Lancashire" and built in 1610. Whilst this statement is accepted as likely to be true (and probably one of the oldest of its type in all of England as well), the date of construction is disputed. It ceased to be used as a school in the mid 19th century. Since 1990, the building has been used as a nursery.

History

Date of construction

Externally, on the lintel above the building's main door, is a stone inscription which reads, "Much Woolton Old School, the oldest [1610] elementary school building in Lancashire". Much doubt has been cast on this date being the exact year of construction – it may have been built earlier or later than what the engraving suggests. The statement was not inscribed until ~1925 under the instruction of the local rector, George Howson. Sources assert that whilst the "161" was original, he had the "0" added "arbitrarily" when the inscription was made.

The Victoria County History entry for Much Woolton states, "A grammar school now abandoned was in existence in the 16th century." Evidence exists of a building used for education in the area as early as 1575. At trial, shortly before his execution, Saint John Almond attested to having attended a Catholic school in Much Woolton around 1580. It is also noted the Childwall Parish Registers of 1597-98 were authored by a local "schoolmaster", and in 1606, an endowment of £60 was made by a local aristocrat to fund a schoolmaster in Woolton. These records have all been used by different authors to suggest they may be evidence that the Old School existed before the inscribed date. However, none of these incidences actually identify this specific building, just the area of Woolton.

It is also claimed that the building's Gothic windows are abnormal for a build allegedly of 1610, indicating an actual construction date "much earlier" than that.

Surviving financial records confirm the school (at least, as an organisation) was definitely in operation by 1625. However, the first known record to explicitly talk of the building itself does not appear until 1641; it states that "it is well knowne the [school]house was built at a common charge" but omits the year of erection. It was the only school for the entire parish of Childwall at the time.

Abandonment
The Old School remained the only school building in Woolton for 200 years. However, it saw a steady decline in its relevance during the 19th century and was ultimately abandoned.

Around 1819, the Old School came into the possession of the Anglican National Society for the Education of the Poor and it was decided a new schoolhouse should be constructed. In 1823, a new school was completed on common land opposite St Peter's Church in the village centre. At the time, local girls had no exclusive school building – those receiving an education were doing so in an auxiliary space of the village workhouse, located adjacent to the site. Hence, the girls were moved into the dedicated new build; boys continued to be taught in the Old School, of which there were 85 pupils at the time.

Provisions for "enlargements" of the new school began to made in 1831. Eventually, a second new schoolhouse was realised nearby in 1848. The girls moved into this new building and the boys moved out of the Old School and into the schoolhouse the girls had just made vacant. Thus, the Old School was abandoned. In 1860, it was sold for £299. Afterwards, the building was at a time used to house animals and as a council potting shed.

20th and 21st centuries
The Old School was almost demolished by the City Council in 1923. They felt it was necessary to remove the derelict building to successfully widen the road. However, local residents were able to convince the authorities of the building's heritage and saved it from destruction. In 1952, its historic relevance was formally recognised by Historic England who listed the building at Grade II* level.

In the 1970s the idea of converting the building into a museum was touted. It was eventually renovated as a house in 1984. Subsequently, it was renovated again as a nursery which began operating in 1990, returning it to its original purpose as a place of education for the first time in ~150 years.

In 2022, a blue plaque was installed on the building's front façade in commemoration of its significance as a local heritage landmark.

Architecture

The building is made from local sandstone, topped with a slate roof. There are Gothic windows at each gable end, suggested to be an "unlikely feature" of a supposed post-reformation school, and it also features a Tudor arched entranceway. Small, mullioned windows were added to the front façade during the restorations of the late 20th century.

It has been described as "structurally unusual" compared to other schoolhouses of the time. The walls consist of just one leaf, half the expected thickness. Many of the bricks are very long (some over four feet) and very heavy, needing lifting gear to manoeuvre. Other similar schools were made with bricks easily manhandled.

See also

Other Grade II* or above listed buildings in Woolton:

Cedarwood
St Peter's Church
Woolton Hall

References

External links
Much Woolton Old School, at Historic England
Woolton Old School, at Historic Liverpool

Grade II* listed buildings in Liverpool
Defunct schools in Liverpool